Aniba vaupesiana is a species of plant in the family Lauraceae. It is endemic to Colombia.

References

vaupesiana
Vulnerable plants
Endemic flora of Colombia
Taxonomy articles created by Polbot